Legendrena is a genus of East African araneomorph spiders in the family Gallieniellidae, and was first described by Norman I. Platnick in 1984.

Species
 it contains seven species, all found in Madagascar:
Legendrena angavokely Platnick, 1984 (type) – Madagascar
Legendrena perinet Platnick, 1984 – Madagascar
Legendrena rolandi Platnick, 1984 – Madagascar
Legendrena rothi Platnick, 1995 – Madagascar
Legendrena spiralis Platnick, 1995 – Madagascar
Legendrena steineri Platnick, 1990 – Madagascar
Legendrena tamatave Platnick, 1984 – Madagascar

References

Araneomorphae genera
Gallieniellidae
Spiders of Madagascar